The Azzurri Sports Club is home to the Adelaide Blue Eagles (ABE), a soccer club based at the Marden Sports Complex, South Australia. It has formerly been known as Napoli Sports Club, Eastern Districts, Eastern Districts Napoli Sports Club, and Eastern Districts Azzurri. Blue Eagles is a participant in the National Premier Leagues South Australia. ABE is a predominantly Italian Australian-supported club.

History
The club was founded in June 1958 as the Napoli Sports Club, owing to most of the inaugural members originating from the Campania region around Naples in Italy. The name was changed to Eastern Districts due to the (then governing body) South Australian Soccer Football Association's ruling of only allowing one Italian named club in the local competition. The club was incorporated as Eastern Districts Napoli Sports Club, with the team known as Eastern Districts, as it represented a number of eastern suburbs of Adelaide.
The club entered a team in the Metropolitan League in 1959 and played its first game against Edinburgh, losing 11–1. At first all home games were played at the Victoria Park Racecourse, then in the South Parklands, followed by Adey Reserve in Firle. The club moved to the new facilities at Marden in 2000.
In 1962 the club played under the name of Eastern Districts Napoli and in 1966 adopted the name Eastern Districts Azzurri. In 1968 the club amalgamated with Seacliff Austria, which enabled them to acquire a place in the 1st division. In 1993 the club changed its name to Adelaide Blue Eagles, with the intention of broadening its appeal.
Since its inception the club has been very successful particularly in the last decade. It has established itself as one of the leaders of local football both on and off the field, fielding many teams at all levels.
They currently run a side which competes in the Amateur League, called MSSC Blue Eagles. MSSC stands for Molinara Sports & Social Club.

Current squad
 the main squad includes:

Club honours
1st Division Champions: 10
1981, 1982, 1992, 1994, 1995, 1996, 2000, 2001, 2003 and 2011

Federation Cup Winners: 6
1984, 1986, 1995, 1997, 1998 and 2010

1st Division Minor Premiers: 6
1992, 1993, 1995, 2000, 2001 and 2002

Coca-Cola Cup Winners: 3
1981, 1982 & 1990

Former players
Peter Deng, later in the South Sudan national football team
Thomas Deng, later in the Australia national football team

References

External links
 Official website

National Premier Leagues clubs
Soccer clubs in South Australia
Association football clubs established in 1958
1958 establishments in Australia
Italian-Australian backed sports clubs of South Australia